Dorothy Love Coates (January 30, 1928 – April 9, 2002) was an American gospel singer.

Biography

Early years 
Born Dorothy McGriff in Birmingham, Alabama, her early years were hard, (she later described them as "the same old thing"). Her minister father left the family when she was six, divorcing her mother thereafter. Dorothy began playing piano in the Baptist Church at age ten, then joined her sisters and brother in the McGriff Singers several years later.

Dorothy quit school to work "all the standard Negro jobs" available in Birmingham in the 1940s: scrubbing floors and working behind the counter in laundries and dry cleaners. She began singing with the Gospel Harmonettes— then known as the Gospel Harmoneers— in the early 1940s. On September 9, 1944, She married Willie Love of The Fairfield Four, one of the most popular quartets of the early years of gospel, but divorced him shortly thereafter. On September 24, 1959, She married Carl Coates of the Sensational Nightingales.

Musical success 

Coates rose to stardom in the 1950s as a member of The Original Gospel Harmonettes. With her "raggedy" voice and preacher's fire she could outsing the most powerful hard gospel male singers of the era. She was also a notable composer, writing songs such as "You Can't Hurry God (He's Right On Time)", "99 and a Half Won't Do" and "That's Enough".

The Gospel Harmonettes— later renamed the Original Gospel Harmonettes— had achieved some fame in an early appearance when the National Baptist Convention came to Birmingham in 1940. Led by Evelyn Starks, an amazing pianist whose style of playing was much imitated, and featuring Mildred Madison Miller, a mezzo soprano who had a down-home sound that came to be a symbol of the group, singing as its lead singer. The group also included, Odessa Edwards, the clear voiced alto whose sermonettes could create a great deal of fervor at performances, Vera Conner Kolb, the piercing soprano of the group whose high notes came with such ease that Marion Williams and other sopranos of the time period imitated her style, and Willie Mae Thomss Newberry Garth, the group's deep-throated alto, the group had a regular half-hour radio show sponsored by A.G. Gaston, a local businessman and community leader.

The group first recorded for RCA in 1949, but without Dorothy Love, after appearing on Arthur Godfrey's Talent Scouts television program. Those recordings while not particularly memorable are considered a rare jewel nowadays and include the two songs "In the Upper Room" and "Move on Up a little Higher".

Their first sides for Specialty Records—"I'm Sealed" and "Get Away Jordan"—recorded with Love in 1951 were far more successful, the group recorded a series of hits in the years that followed before disbanding in 1958.

Dorothy was the driving force behind the group's success, both on record and in person, singing with such spirit that the other members of the group would occasionally have to lead her back to the stage—a device that James Brown copied and made part of his act in the 1960s, but which was wholly genuine in Love's case. She also took over the role, particularly after Odessa Edwards' retirement, of preacher/narrator, directing very pointed criticisms from the stage of the evils she saw in the church and in the world at large.

During the years of her retirement, from 1959 to 1961, (then) Dorothy Love became active in the civil rights movement, working with Martin Luther King Jr. As she was fond of telling church audiences, "The Lord has blessed our going out and our coming in. He's blessed our sitting in, too." While many other gospel artists were slow to address political issues head-on, Coates spoke out against the war in Vietnam, racism and other evils.

Coates was just as plainspoken when criticizing the exploitative treatment that she and other gospel singers received from gospel promoters, both white and black. She reformed the Harmonettes in 1961 and when that group disbanded later in the decade, continued touring with a group known as the Dorothy Love Coates Singers. She recorded, both individually and with her group, on Savoy Records, Vee-Jay Records and Columbia Records in the 1960s and made occasional appearances, but no recordings, after 1980. She appeared in the films "The Long Walk Home" and "Beloved" at the end of her career.

Coates died in Birmingham on April 9, 2002, of heart failure, at the age of 74.

Legacy 
While Coates vigorously rejected all offers to cross over to pop or soul music, a number of artists, including Little Richard, imitated her sanctified singing style. Other secular songwriters drew on her songs for inspiration, sometimes simply taking the title, as in the case of Wilson Pickett's wholly different soul tune "99 and a Half Won't Do", and sometimes adapting both lyrics and title, as in the case of the Supremes's hit "You Can't Hurry Love". Jerry Garcia Band recorded her "I'll Be with Thee" on Cats Under the Stars, and performed "Strange Man" in concert. Singer Mavis Staples has stated that Dorothy Love Coates was an influence on her vocal style.

References

Further reading 
Tony Heilbut, The Gospel Sound: Good News and Bad Times Limelight Editions, 1997, .
Horace Clarence Boyer, How Sweet the Sound: The Golden Age of Gospel Elliott and Clark, 1995, .

1928 births
2002 deaths
American gospel singers
Musicians from Birmingham, Alabama
20th-century African-American women singers
Savoy Records artists